Billboard publishes annual lists of songs based on chart performance over the course of a year based on Nielsen Broadcast Data Systems and SoundScan information. For 2011, the list of the top 100 Billboard Hot 100 Year-End songs was published on December 9, calculated with data from December 4, 2010 to November 26, 2011. At the number one position was Adele's "Rolling in the Deep", which stayed atop the Hot 100 for seven consecutive weeks, and in the top thirty for most of the year.

See also
 2011 in American music
 List of Billboard Hot 100 number-one singles of 2011
 List of Billboard Hot 100 top-ten singles in 2011

References

United States Hot 100 Year-End
Billboard charts